Nell Miller is an English tennis player.

Miller currently plays college tennis at North Carolina State. In 2022 Miller and doubles partner Jaeda Daniel became the first NC State players to win the NCAA Division I Women's Doubles Championship. Miller and Daniel additionally earned ITA All-American accolade in 2022. 

In June of 2022 Miller and partner Sonay Kartal earned a wild card entry into the 2022 Wimbledon Women's doubles tournament.

Grand Slam doubles performance timeline

ITF Circuit finals

Doubles: 3 (2 titles)

Notes

References

External links
 
 

British female tennis players
Living people
NC State Wolfpack women's tennis players
Year of birth missing (living people)